The Waverley Wildcats Baseball Club is a Baseball Club based in the Melbourne suburb of Glen Waverley, The club was the original majority owners of the Waverley Reds professional Baseball team in the Australian Baseball League.

The Club enters 5 Senior teams, 2 Women's teams and various junior teams in the Baseball Victoria Summer League. In Winter, the club enters 3 Senior teams and 4-5 Junior teams.

History
The Waverley Wildcats Baseball Club was formed 1959. The club was originally known as Glen Waverley RSL Youth Baseball Club and changed to its current name in the early 1960s.

Past winners of the Junior Club Champion include : Stewart McConnell, Adam Burton

Past winners of the Senior Club Champion include " Glenn Otter (2-time winner)

References

External links
Waverley Wildcats Baseball Club
Waverley Reds
Baseball Victoria Summer League
Melbourne Winter Baseball League

1959 establishments in Australia
Baseball teams established in 1959
Sports clubs established in 1959
Australian baseball clubs
Baseball teams in Melbourne
Glen Waverley, Victoria
Sport in the City of Monash